Anne-Dauphine Julliand (born 23 November 1973) is a French woman writer. She then made the documentary film  (Et les mistrals gagnants), released in 2017.

Life 
Julliand was born in Paris. She studied journalism, then wrote, first in the daily press.

In July 2000, she married and had four children: Gaspard, Thaïs, Azylis and Arthur.

In 2006, her daughter Thaïs, born 29 February 2004 is diagnosed as a bearer of a metachromatic leukodystrophy, a rare form of lysosomal storage disease, and therefore has a very short life expectancy. In 2007, Thais died of her disease, while her younger sister Azylis was also found to be a bearer of leukodystrophy. Thanks to a hematopoietic stem cell transplantation, the disease progresses more slowly in her than in Thaïs. Azylis finally dies on 20 February 2017.

Work 
In 2011, Julliand published Deux petits pas sur le sable mouillé, which tells the story of the life, illness and death of Thaïs, at "Les Arènes" publishing house; this testimony is a great success, with 260,000 copies sold.

This book received the 2011 testimony prize of Le Pèlerin and is translated into twenty languages. In an interview with Famille chrétienne, she testifies to her Catholic faith and how it has been strengthened in the face of her daughter's hardships and sufferings. She says that love is the only cure and that she sees God behind this love, God's compassion.

On 23 May 2013, she published Une journée particulière, which recounts from her point of view the day of February 29, 2012, the day when Thaïs would have been eight years old.

In 2016, she made a feature-length documentary film Et les Mistrals gagnants on the theme of children and disease, in line with her book Deux petits pas sur le sable mouillé . The film was released on 1 February 2017.

References

External links 
 Repose en paix ma belle Azylis on Aleteia
 Anne-Dauphine Julliand on KTO
 Anne-Dauphine Julliand et Laurence Kiberlain: le bonheur malgré tout  in La Vie

Writers from Paris
1973 births
Living people
21st-century French women writers